The Tamil Nadu Generation and Distribution Corporation Limited (TANGEDCO) is an electrical power generation and distribution public sector undertaking owned by the Government of Tamil Nadu. It was formed on 1 November 2010 under section 131 of the Electricity Act of 2003, and is the successor to the erstwhile Tamil Nadu Electricity Board. The electricity board's generation and distribution wings are its nucleus.  TANGEDCO is a subsidiary of TNEB Limited.

Operation

Generation

To satisfy the energy needs of the  state, Tamil Nadu Electricity Board has a total installed capacity of 10,214 MW which includes shares from the State government, Central government and Independent power producers. The state also has installations with renewable energy sources such as windfarms that supply up to 4,300 MW. Due to the astronomical increase in energy demand in recent years, the state has a power deficit which is estimated to be approx. 11.9% as of Feb 2009. To meet the ever-increasing energy demand, TNEB has proposed a number of next-generation projects to be constructed over the next 5 years.

The company operates four large thermal power stations:

 Ennore Thermal Power Station (ETPS) - 450 MW (2x60, 3x110 MW)
 Mettur Thermal Power Station (MTPS) - 1440 MW (4x210, 1x600 MW)
 North Chennai Thermal Power Station (NCTPS) 1830 MW (3x210 MW, 2x600 MW)
 Tuticorin Thermal Power Station (TTPS) - 1050 MW (5x210 MW)

The Company Operates large Wind Power Stations:
Siemens, GE, Enercon, Sulzon Group, Goldwind, Vestas – Tamil Nadu's wind power capacity is around 29% of India's total. The Government of Tamil Nadu realized the importance and need for renewable energy, and set up a separate Agency, as registered society, called the Tamil Nadu Energy Development Agency (TEDA) as early as 1985. Now, Tamil Nadu has become a leader in Wind Power in India. In Muppandal windfarm the total capacity is 3500 MW, the largest wind power plant in India. The total wind installed capacity is 7684 MW from 13,69,856 wind turbines (As per 2013 survey from TEDA). During the fiscal year 2016-17, the electricity generation is 9.521 GWh, with about a 15% capacity utilization factor.

Distribution
TNEB has a consumer base of about 20 million consumers. 100% rural electrification has been achieved. The per capita consumption of Tamil Nadu is 1000 units. To achieve the goal of electrification of all households, the Government has launched the  Rajiv Gandhi Grameen Vidyutikaran Yojana (RGGVY) scheme, where, if grid connectivity is  not feasible or not cost effective, then "Decentralized Distributed Generation" is permitted. Even when Tamil Nadu had an option to share the electricity with neighbouring States it never happened.

The Ministry of Power has launched the restructured Accelerated Power Development and Reforms Programme scheme under the 11th five-year plan. The plan is expected to achieve a reliable and quality power supply and to minimize the loss of energy.

New Projects
 Uppur Thermal Power Project(2 × 800 MW) 
 North Chennai Thermal Power Station Stage III Thermal Power Project (1 × 800 MW) 
 North Chennai Thermal Power Station Stage – IV (2 × 800 MW) 
 Tuticorin Thermal Power Station (1 × 800 MW)
 Udangudi STPP Stage-I (2 × 660 MW)
 Ennore SEZ STPP (2 × 660 MW)

References

External links
 

Electric power distribution network operators in India
Electric-generation companies of India
Energy in Tamil Nadu
State agencies of Tamil Nadu
State electricity agencies of India
Indian companies established in 2010
Energy companies established in 2010
Non-renewable resource companies established in 2010
Companies based in Tamil Nadu
2010 establishments in Tamil Nadu

ta:தமிழ்நாடு மின்சார வாரியம்